Very Special may refer to:
 Very Special (Debra Laws album)
 Very Special (Junko Onishi album)
 Very Special (song), a 1981 song by Debra Laws